Elyria is an unincorporated community in McPherson County, Kansas, United States.  As of the 2020 census, the population of the community and nearby areas was 120.  It is located southeast of McPherson at Old U.S. 81 Highway and Comanche Rd.

History

Early history

For many millennia, the Great Plains of North America was inhabited by nomadic Native Americans.  From the 16th century to 18th century, the Kingdom of France claimed ownership of large parts of North America.  In 1762, after the French and Indian War, France secretly ceded New France to Spain, per the Treaty of Fontainebleau.  In 1802, Spain returned most of the land to France, but keeping title to about 7,500 square miles.

19th century
In 1803, most of the land for modern day Kansas was acquired by the United States from France as part of the 828,000 square mile Louisiana Purchase for 2.83 cents per acre. In 1848, after the Mexican–American War, the Treaty of Guadalupe Hidalgo with Spain brought into the United States all or part of land for ten future states, including southwest Kansas. In 1854, the Kansas Territory was organized, then in 1861 Kansas became the 34th U.S. state. In 1867, McPherson County was established within the Kansas Territory, which included the land for modern day Elyria.

Elyria was a shipping point on the Missouri Pacific Railroad. It was named after Elyria, Ohio.

A post office was moved from King City to Elyria in 1887 then it existed until 1954.

Demographics

For statistical purposes, the United States Census Bureau has defined Elyria as a census-designated place (CDP).

Education
The community is served by Moundridge USD 423 public school district.

Elyria is home of the Elyria Christian School, a private elementary and secondary school.

References

Further reading

External links
 McPherson County maps: Current, Historic, KDOT

Unincorporated communities in McPherson County, Kansas
Unincorporated communities in Kansas
1887 establishments in Kansas
Populated places established in 1887